A gaonburha or gaoburha is the leader of an Assamese gaon or village. The role of gaonburhas in Assamese gaons that are under mouzas are limited, since mouzadars take the responsibility of the gaonburha. For gaons that are far from district heads or major cities, gaonburhas still play definitive roles.

Similar position exist in Naga society.

Titles of national or ethnic leadership
Assamese people